Sekolah Menengah Kebangsaan Seksyen 9 is located in Section 9, Shah Alam in the state of Selangor, Malaysia. The school was established in 1997. The school is one of the best National Secondary School in Petaling Perdana district and the best in Shah Alam. The pupil of the school are called "Niners".

Schools in Selangor
Shah Alam